Abingdon Park is a park on Park Road in the northwest of the town of Abingdon, Oxfordshire (formerly in Berkshire), England.

Overview 
The park is surrounded by large residential houses and, to the east, Abingdon School, a private school. Abingdon Bowls Club is located in the park. At the northern entrance is a monument to Prince Albert (1819–1861, the husband of Queen Victoria), 48 feet high and designed by John Gibbs of Oxford and erected in 1865.

History 
Albert Park was formerly Conduit Field. From 1860, the park together with the surrounding Victorian and Edwardian houses were laid out by
Christ's Hospital of Abingdon.

Architects who worked on the estate included Edwin Dolby (1838–1900), his pupil, J. G. Timothy West (1860–1931), and A. B. West (1885–1957), as well as John Gibbs who designed the 1865 stone monument to Prince Albert in the park. This memorial was built by Charles Selby.

Location 
Park Crescent runs along the west, north and east sides of the park in a large crescent shape around the park. A spur of Park Crescent continues to the north. The straight Park Road is to the south of the park and also continues to the east and the west.
Conduit Road runs south from the southeastern corner of Albert Park. It is named after the water conduit that used to run in line with the current road. This conduit carried spring water from Albert Park to a water fountain in Ock Street.

Gallery

References

External links 
 Abingdon Town Council information

Parks and open spaces in Oxfordshire
Abingdon-on-Thames